Los Enchiladas! is a 1999 film written, directed by and starring stand-up comedian Mitch Hedberg. The film was shot and set in Minnesota.

Content
The film is loosely based on Hedberg's life growing up in Minnesota and his experience working in restaurants.  It parodies a chain Mexican restaurant in a suburb of St. Paul, Minnesota, on the day before Cinco de Mayo, the busiest day of the year for Mexican restaurants.  The storyline follows an ensemble cast of absurd characters that work in and visit the restaurant throughout the course of one day.

Cast and locations
The cast is composed of many of Mitch's comedian friends and rounded out by local Minnesota actors.

Three different local restaurants were used to portray the film's restaurant; one for the dining room scenes, a second for the kitchen scenes, and a third for the outside of the restaurant, which was a Chi-Chi's that Mitch actually worked at many years before and was the main inspiration for the ridiculously inauthentic Los Enchiladas.

Availability
Los Enchiladas! premiered at the 1999 Sundance Film Festival, and has only been shown publicly a handful of times since, at comedy festivals and tributes to the deceased director, such as the one at the Paramount Theatre in Anderson, Indiana on August 12, 2010. It has never been publicly released for purchase or download, although Mitch's fanbase has expressed a continuing desire for the film to become available.

In April 2011, an unofficial workprint copy was released on various torrent and peer-to-peer sites.  This release was opposed by Hedberg's widow, Lynn Shawcroft, who is working towards a wider release of the film.

References

External links

1999 comedy films
1999 films
American comedy films
Films set in Minnesota
Films shot in Minnesota
1990s American films